Ahmet Çakı (born June 22, 1975) is a Turkish professional basketball coach. He was most recently the head coach for Tofaş of the Turkish Basketbol Süper Ligi (BSL).

Coaching career
On June 20, 2016, Çaki was appointed as head coach of Alba Berlin of the German Basketball Bundesliga.

On June 20, 2018, Çaki returned to Darüşşafaka for a second stint as the new head coach.

On November 26, 2021, he has signed with Tofaş of the Turkish Basketbol Süper Ligi (BSL).

References

External links
 Ahmet Çakı at euroleague.net
 About of Ahmet Çakı (Turkish)

1975 births
Living people
Alba Berlin basketball coaches
Anadolu Efes S.K. coaches
Basketbol Süper Ligi head coaches
Darüşşafaka Basketbol coaches
Sportspeople from Mersin
Tofaş S.K. coaches
Turkish basketball coaches
Turkish expatriate basketball people in Germany
Turkish expatriate basketball people in Italy